Beverly LaHaye (born April 30, 1929) is an American Christian conservative activist and author who founded Concerned Women for America (CWA) in San Diego, California in 1979. She was the wife of Tim LaHaye, the evangelical Christian minister and prolific author of the Left Behind series, until his death in 2016.

Life and education 
Beverly Jean was born in metro Detroit, Michigan on April 30, 1929 to Lowell Ardo and Nellie Elizabeth (née Pitts) Davenport. Her father was a factory worker in Southfield, Michigan and died of a ruptured appendix when Beverly was almost two years old. Within two years, Nellie Elizabeth married Daniel Ratcliffe, a tool maker in the auto industry in Oakland County, Michigan. From then on, Beverly Jean and her older sister Blanche Aileen used their stepfather's surname as their own. She graduated from Highland Park Community High School in 1946, the highest degree she would ever earn. She attended Bob Jones University (then named Bob Jones College) one year and married Tim LaHaye after that year in 1947. In 69 years of marriage, the LaHayes had four children, Linda, Larry, Lee, and Lori, and nine grandchildren.

Published works
LaHaye and her husband co-authored The Act of Marriage: The Beauty of Sexual Love in 1976.

LaHaye wrote The Spirit-Controlled Woman in 1976, a companion to her husband's book The Spirit-Controlled Temperament. A revised and expanded edition of the book, The New Spirit-Controlled Woman, was released in 2005. The Desires of a Woman's Heart was released in 1993.

Concerned Women for America (CWA)
LaHaye formed Concerned Women for America in 1979. Initially, CWA was a reaction to the National Organization for Women and a 1978 Barbara Walters interview with feminist Betty Friedan. LaHaye stated that she believed Friedan’s goal was "to dismantle the bedrock of American culture: the family," and that Christian women were not included in discussions of women's rights. LaHaye held a rally in a local San Diego auditorium which marked the beginning of CWA. While CWA was originally intended to be a local group, the organization was established nationwide within two years. The organization calls itself
"the nation's largest public policy women's organization devoted to biblical principles." When CWA's headquarters moved to Washington, D.C., LaHaye "announced at a press conference: 'This is our message: the feminists do not speak for all women in America, and CWA is here in Washington to end the monopoly of feminists who claim to speak for all women.'"

CWA is a nonprofit organization under Section 501(c)(3) of the Internal Revenue Code that is "supported by hundreds of local chapters across the country." In 2014, Salon stated that "CWA [had] become a powerful political force, claiming over half a million members."

Bibliography 
 How to Develop Your Child's Temperament (1977) 
 I Am a Woman by God's Design (1980) 
 The Act of Marriage: The Beauty of Sexual Love (1976)  (co-authored with Timothy LaHaye)
 The Desires of a Woman's Heart (1993)
 The Restless Woman (1984) 
 The Spirit-Controlled Woman (1976)

References

External links
 Beverly LaHaye appearances on C-SPAN
 Beverly LaHaye biography (CWFA)
 Beverly LaHaye biography (National Women's History Museum)
 The Beverly LaHaye Institute
 Concerned Women for America

1929 births
Living people
20th-century American non-fiction writers
20th-century American women
20th-century American women writers
20th-century evangelicals
21st-century American women
21st-century evangelicals
Activists from California
American anti-abortion activists
American evangelicals
American nonprofit executives
American women non-fiction writers
California Republicans
Evangelical writers
Female critics of feminism
Intelligent design advocates
New Right (United States)
Women nonprofit executives